Robert A. Taft (1889–1953) was the U.S. Senator from Ohio from 1939 to 1953.

Senator Taft may also refer to:

Bezaleel Taft Jr. (1780–1846), Massachusetts State Senate
Bezaleel Taft Sr. (1750–1839), Massachusetts State Senate
Kingsley A. Taft (1903–1970), Ohio State Senate
Robert Taft Jr. (1917–1993), Ohio State Senate
Russell S. Taft (1835–1902), Vermont State Senate
William W. Taft (born 1932), Ohio State Senate